The Tritul is a left tributary of the river Valea Largă in Romania. It flows into the Valea Largă near Urca.

References

Rivers of Romania
Rivers of Cluj County